Calgary French & International School (CFIS) is a private French language immersion and International Baccalaureate school in Calgary, Alberta, Canada. All subjects are taught in French, except English and Spanish.

According to the Fraser Institute Report Card on Alberta's Secondary and Elementary Schools 2019, CFIS achieved a top ranking of schools in Alberta. It is a United Nations Educational, Scientific and Cultural Organization (UNESCO) Associated School, as well as Round Square affiliated, and it is accredited by the Canadian Accredited Independent Schools.

The $20 million  school facility was built in two phases, in 2003 and 2005. The two-story school facility includes 45 classrooms, two library/resource areas, two science labs, dedicated music rooms, dedicated art studios, an outdoor classroom,2 dedicated cafeterias, double-court regulation gyms, a junior-sized baseball diamond, a running track and soccer pitch, and two theatre-style classrooms, as well as a stage also acting as a gym for early childhood education.

History 
The Calgary French School (the predecessor to the Calgary French and International School) was founded after the passing of the Official Languages Act in September 1969. Many mothers had practiced French on their own, and sought to establish an educational institution that could teach young in an all-French environment, called French immersion.

Calgary French School began in church basements, and  became a part of the Sacred Heart School in 1974. Throughout this time there was consistent growth in both student numbers and scholarly reputation. Over time, the community desired a space to call home. In late 1999, the shared space was reclaimed by its owners, so the school sought its own building. A campaign began to raise funds to purchase land and to construct a new site for the growing school.

References

External links 
 Official Site

Educational institutions established in 1969
Elementary schools in Calgary
French-language schools in Alberta
High schools in Calgary
Middle schools in Calgary
Private schools in Alberta
Trilingual schools
1969 establishments in Alberta